In mathematics, the Cauchy principal value, named after Augustin Louis Cauchy, is a method for assigning values to certain improper integrals which would otherwise be undefined.

Formulation
Depending on the type of singularity in the integrand , the Cauchy principal value is defined according to the following rules:

In some cases it is necessary to deal simultaneously with singularities both at a finite number  and at infinity. This is usually done by a limit of the form

In those cases where the integral may be split into two independent, finite limits,

and

then the function is integrable in the ordinary sense. The result of the procedure for principal value is the same as the ordinary integral; since it no longer matches the definition, it is technically not a "principal value".

Define   to be that same contour, where the portion inside the disk of radius  around the pole has been removed. Provided the function  is integrable over  no matter how small  becomes, then the Cauchy principal value is the limit:

In the case of Lebesgue-integrable functions, that is, functions which are integrable in absolute value, these definitions coincide with the standard definition of the integral.

Principal value integrals play a central role in the discussion of Hilbert transforms.

Distribution theory 

Let  be the set of bump functions, i.e., the space of smooth functions with compact support on the real line . Then the map

defined via the Cauchy principal value as

is a distribution. The map itself may sometimes be called the principal value (hence the notation p.v.). This distribution appears, for example, in the Fourier transform of the Sign function and the Heaviside step function.

Well-definedness as a Distribution
To prove the existence of the limit 

and hence 

since  is continuous and L'Hopital's rule applies.

Therefore,  exists and by applying the mean value theorem to  we get:

And furthermore:

we note that the map

is bounded by the usual seminorms for Schwartz functions . Therefore, this map defines, as it is obviously linear, a continuous functional on the Schwartz space and therefore a tempered distribution.

The principal value therefore is defined on even weaker assumptions such as  integrable with compact support and differentiable at 0.

More general definitions

The principal value is the inverse distribution of the function  and is almost the only distribution with this property:

where  is a constant and  the Dirac distribution.

In a broader sense, the principal value can be defined for a wide class of singular integral kernels on the Euclidean space . If  has an isolated singularity at the origin, but is an otherwise "nice" function, then the principal-value distribution is defined on compactly supported smooth functions by

Such a limit may not be well defined, or, being well-defined, it may not necessarily define a distribution. It is, however, well-defined if  is a continuous homogeneous function of degree  whose integral over any sphere centered at the origin vanishes. This is the case, for instance, with the Riesz transforms.

Examples
Consider the values of two limits:

This is the Cauchy principal value of the otherwise ill-defined expression

Also:

Similarly, we have

This is the principal value of the otherwise ill-defined expression

but

Notation

Different authors use different notations for the Cauchy principal value of a function , among others:

as well as  P.V.,    and V.P.

See also 
Hadamard finite part integral
Hilbert transform
Sokhotski–Plemelj theorem

References 

Augustin-Louis Cauchy
Mathematical analysis
Generalized functions
Integrals
Summability methods
Schwartz distributions